Luxembourg competed at the 2018 European Athletics Championships in Berlin, Germany, from 6–12 August 2018. A delegation of 3 athletes were sent to represent the country.

The following athletes were selected to compete by the Luxembourg Athletics Federation.

 Men 
 Track and road

Field events

Women
 Track and road

References

Nations at the 2018 European Athletics Championships
Luxembourg at the European Athletics Championships
European Athletics Championships